Montserrat is the seventh solo album by English singer-songwriter John Otway. Released in 2017, Otway was backed by The Big Band, who he had toured with several times prior.

Development
The idea for the album came when a fan invited Otway to Montserrat. Otway later said that it was around the same time that he had learned about the founding of AIR Studios Montserrat in the late 1970s. This led to a Kickstarter being set up, where Otway informed fans that £10,000 would enable the album "to be recorded in my guitarist's garage in Essex!" If the fund reached £30,000 they could both record in Montserrat and enlist Grammy Award-winner Chris Birkett to produce. Nearly £40,000 had been raised by the time the campaign ended. It was later revealed that recording would take place in Olveston House.

Track listing

Personnel

 John Otway – vocals, theremin
 Richard Holgarh – electric guitar, keyboards, backing vocals
 Murray Torkildsen – electric guitar, acoustic guitar, backing vocals
 Adam Batterbee – drums
 Seymour – bass
 Chris Birkett – electric guitar, keyboards
 Peter Filleul – keyboards
 Natalie Wong – violin, viola
 The Montserrat Youth Choir – backing vocals
 Chris Birkett – producer
 Malcom Atkin – engineer

References

2017 albums
John Otway albums